Australian Fashion Week, formerly Mercedes-Benz Fashion Week Australia (MBFWA) and  Afterpay Australian Fashion Week  (AAFW), is an annual fashion industry event, or fashion week, showcasing the latest seasonal collections from Australian designers. Run by American company by IMG since 2013, the event has been held at the multi-arts center Carriageworks in Redfern.

Fashion weeks take place all around the world and often have a big on the trends that follow throughout the year. Australia's fashion week is not only limited to fashion trends. Hair and make up trends are also a big part of the event and designers often take the opportunity to make big statements through their designs.

History

The event was the brainchild of PR consultant and former ski magazine reporter Simon Lock. Launched in 1996, in its debut year the event featured shows by Australian designers including Akira Isogawa, Alex Perry and Wayne Cooper. The event had mixed success; British fashion writer Susan Owens wrote a scathing review dubbing it "Fashion Weak" and writing that 25 broken-hearted designers had thrown away their money.

In 2005, event founder Simon Lock sold the event and its parent company Australian Fashion Innovators to the New York-based International Management Group. The deal was rumoured to have been worth several million dollars.

Rosemount Estate wineries acquired naming rights from Mercedes-Benz in 2006 and the event was renamed Rosemount Australian Fashion Week (RAFW), but the principal sponsorship passed back to Mercedes-Benz in 2011. In 2020, Afterpay took on the naming rights of the inaugural event.

Lock worked with IMG for the next five years before departing the company in 2010. In 2011 he was presented with the Australian Fashion Laureate Award, the first non-designer to receive it. At the time he was building a ski hotel in Japan and spending more time with his children.

The 2021 event was renamed Afterpay Australian Fashion Week, now sponsored by Afterpay. Two new Indigenous Australian events introduced 13 First Nations designers to the wider industry, including Grace Lillian Lee, Ngarru Miimi, Aarli, Kirrikin Australia, Maara Collective, Liandra Swim and Ngali, and the event started with a Welcome to Country and smoking ceremony.

Significant models and events
In 1997, supermodel Linda Evangelista's appearance in the Alex Perry show drew international attention to the event. Eva Herzigova donned a $500,000 pearl bikini to launch Tigerlily's first runway show in 2001.

Jade Jagger modelled for Charlie Brown in 2005. Dita Von Teese was a guest of honour in 2007, giving a sexy performance that featured her straddling a giant MAC lipstick. Singer Macy Gray performed at the Marcs show in 2008, and celebrity fashion blogger Susie Bubble covered the 2010 event.

In the early 21st century, 2001 saw some notorious appearances of animals as a runway gimmick. Model Kristy Hinze wore a snakeskin bikini with a live snake draped around her shoulders. It began to wrap itself around her neck, to her evident discomfort. Meanwhile, streetwear label Ksubi (then named Tsubi) released 169 live rats onto the runway, one of which was killed, prompting an RSPCA investigation.

In 2013, MBFWA exhibited many of the same Australian designers, while also introducing upcoming designers. These new generation 2013 included Betty Train, Desert Designs, Faddoul, Jamie Ashkar, Natalie & Sarah, The Letter Q, and Tristan Melle. Some of the most praised designers showcased on the runway were White Sands, Christopher Esber, Bec and Bridge, Aurelio Costarella, and Camilla and Marc.

Cancelled events
In 2020, MBFWA events was cancelled due to the COVID-19 pandemic and the consequent public gathering and travel restrictions.

Venues
Australian Fashion Week has previously been held in April/May at the Fox Film Studios, Moore Park in Sydney, and at St Kilda pier in Melbourne. It was announced in October 2012 that MMBFWA was moving from its Overseas Passenger Terminal location in The Rocks at Sydney's Circular Quay to the multidisciplinary arts centre Carriageworks in Eveleigh, and the 2013 event was the first one held there.

Governance
It is run by IMG, in association with sponsors.

Impact and criticism

Many well-known and influential designers as well as new and upcoming designers participate in the fashion festival. Some of the designers include Alice McCall, Bec & Bridge, Ginger & Smart, Ksubi, Lisa Ho, Oroton, We Are Handsome, and Whitesands. Australian Fashion Week has helped bring global attention to a number of Australian designers such as [Lisa Ho, Alice McCall, Alex Perry, Toni Maticevski, Collette Dinnigan, Leona Edmiston, and J'Aton Couture.

Australian Fashion Week has attracted criticism of being out of sync with the global fashion market; some popular designers pulled out of the 2012 event in order to prepare for international events. In 2015, the event was changed to May to become the global Resort show for fashion buyers and media.

The event has been criticised for featuring inexperienced emerging designers rather than big names, that its collections are conspicuously 'influenced' by European designers, and that it resorts to cheap theatrics that have included everything from Afghan hounds to midgets in lederhosen.

However, fashion journalist Marion Hume argues that the non-participation of established designers is welcome. "It lets those designers grow [by going overseas] and gives space for younger ones to come up", she said. "It's a natural progression and shows a healthiness in Australian Fashion Week".

Mercedes-Benz Fashion Festival Sydney

Mercedes-Benz Fashion Festival Sydney was a schedule of fashion events showcasing the contemporary Spring Summer Collections of Australia's leading designer brands. The festival was held at the Sydney Town Hall and throughout the city, months after Australian Fashion Week, hosted by IMG and Mercedes-Benz fashion week, connecting it with the same designers and production style. As retailers struggled with declining sales, MBFF was pitched as an event to show consumers how to wear the clothes currently on the retail racks. IMG fashion hosted the whole event, and had control over both Fashion Week and the festival.

Although Mercedes-Benz Fashion Festival Sydney was primarily based during Australian Fashion week, they also supported and put together runway shows throughout the year for the designer brands they supported. In May 2013, the festival hosted a fashion-focused seminar featuring Mercedes Benz Fashion Week Australia designers Camilla and Marc and KIRRILY JOHNSTON.

Mercedes-Benz Fashion Festival Brisbane
Mercedes-Benz Fashion Festival Brisbane is a schedule of fashion events showcasing the contemporary Spring Summer Collections of Australia's leading designer brands. The festival is held at the Brisbane Town Hall and throughout the city in August.

References

External links

Fashion events in Australia
Annual events in Australia
1996 establishments in Australia
Recurring events established in 1996
Fashion weeks
Arts festivals in Australia
Autumn events in Australia